Keratopathy may refer to:

 Florida keratopathy, a disease of the eye found in dogs, cats, horses and birds
 Thygeson's superficial punctate keratopathy, a disease of the human eye